The 1957 LFF Lyga was the 36th season of the LFF Lyga football competition in Lithuania.  It was contested by 14 teams, and Elnias Šiauliai won the championship.

League standings

References
RSSSF

LFF Lyga seasons
1957 in Lithuania
LFF